Benjamín Galindo Marentes (born 11 December 1960), nicknamed El Maestro (The Master), is a Mexican former professional footballer who played as a midfielder. He participated with the national team in the 1994 FIFA World Cup.

Playing career

International
Galindo made 65 appearances and scored 28 goals for the Mexico national football team from 1983 to 1997.

Coaching career
Galindo was the former coach (director tecnico) of the powerhouse Mexican association football club, CD Guadalajara, until he was replaced in the 2005 season. He was also the coach of Santos Laguna but was once again replaced due to poor results.

Galindo was the coach of Cruz Azul until he was replaced with Enrique Meza. He then moved to Club Atlas. Benjamin Galindo for the first time was champion as coach with Club Santos Laguna in the Clausura 2012.

On 18 August 2013, Galindo was sacked by CD Guadalajara.

In January 2016, Galindo was hired as the head coach for Corinthians FC of San Antonio

On November 13, 2018, Galindo was announced as the assistant manager under Matias Almeyda's staff at San Jose Earthquakes.

Personal life
Galindo is the father of the Mexican defender the same name, Benjamín Galindo Jr.

Career statistics

International goals

Honours

Player
Guadalajara
Mexican Primera División: 1986–87

Santos Laguna
Mexican Primera División: Invierno 1996

Cruz Azul
Mexican Primera División: Invierno 1997
CONCACAF Champions' Cup: 1997

Pachuca
Mexican Primera División: Invierno 1999

Individual
Mexican Primera División Golden Ball: 1986–87

Manager
Santos Laguna
Mexican Primera División: Clausura 2012

Individual
Mexican Primera División Best Manager of the tournament: Clausura 2012

References

External links

1960 births
Living people
Footballers from Zacatecas
Association football midfielders
Mexican footballers
Mexico international footballers
1991 CONCACAF Gold Cup players
1993 Copa América players
1994 FIFA World Cup players
1995 King Fahd Cup players
1995 Copa América players
Tampico Madero F.C. footballers
C.D. Guadalajara footballers
Santos Laguna footballers
Cruz Azul footballers
C.F. Pachuca players
Liga MX players
Mexican football managers
C.D. Guadalajara managers
Santos Laguna managers
Cruz Azul managers
Atlas F.C. managers
San Jose Earthquakes non-playing staff